Progress Party or Party for Progress was a fascist political party in Iran led by Abdolhossein Teymourtash, described as the "spurious" party of government and functioning as a "vehicle for executing royal intentions" of Reza Shah.

Modeled after Mussolini's National Fascist Party and Atatürk's Republican People's Party, it subscribed ideas similar to the short-lived New Iran Party.

With the fall of Abdolhossein Teymourtash in late 1932, the party soon melted away and was outlawed on the grounds that it harbors republican sentiments.

References

Political parties established in 1927
1927 establishments in Iran
Political parties disestablished in 1932
1932 disestablishments in Iran
Monarchist parties in Iran
Fascist parties
Political parties in Pahlavi Iran (1925–1941)
Fascism in Iran
Banned far-right parties